Croydon Common Football Club was an amateur and, later on, professional football club based in Croydon.

History
The team formed in 1897 as an amateur church team competing in local leagues. They turned professional in 1907, joining the Southern League Second Division. A final place of third was achieved despite the stand at the Crescent being burnt down.

A move was made to the Nest (future home of Crystal Palace) in 1908 where promotion to the Southern League First Division was achieved. In the FA Cup, Football League members Bradford Park Avenue were beaten and Woolwich Arsenal taken to a replay before final defeat.

An immediate return was made to the Second Division after finishing second from bottom. At the new ground another main stand was damaged; the roof being removed in a gale.

Seasons of mid to high table finishes then followed until the 1913–14 season when the championship was achieved again with only two defeats.

Again, Common's stay in the First Division resulted in a second from bottom placing. Relegation was not experienced due to the suspension of the League during World War I. In 1917 the club was finally wound up, the only First Division club not to return to action after the War.

Players
Dick Allman: Reading, Portsmouth, Plymouth Argyle, Stoke, Liverpool, Burslem Port Vale, Leicester Fosse and Arsenal
Arthur Box: Birmingham City, Stoke and Burslem Port Vale goalkeeper
William Balmer: England and Everton
Harold Dawson: Everton and Blackpool
Bob Evans: Wales and Blackburn Rovers
Dave Gardner: Scotland, West Ham United
Harry Hadley: England and Aston Villa
Jack Harrow: England and Chelsea
 Ted Price: Stockport County and Queens Park Rangers goalkeeper
Sandy Tait: 1901 FA Cup Final winner with Tottenham Hotspur
Ernie Williamson: England and Arsenal
Sam Wolstenhome: England, Everton and Blackburn Rovers

Records
Most appearances: Percy Barnfather, 286
Most goals: Percy Barnfather, 88

See also
:Category:Croydon Common F.C. players

Sources
The Official Centenary History of the Southern League

References

External links
History of Croydon Common Football Club
Croydon Common on Football Club History Database

 
Defunct football clubs in England
Association football clubs established in 1897
Association football clubs disestablished in 1917
Southern Football League clubs
Sport in the London Borough of Croydon
1897 establishments in England
1917 disestablishments in England
Defunct football clubs in London